Mediavideo was the teletext service broadcast on the primary Mediaset television channels (Rete 4, Canale 5, Italia 1) in Italy.

References

Television in Italy